Seeds of Life is a science fiction novel by American writer John Taine (pseudonym of Eric Temple Bell). It was first published in 1951 by Fantasy Press in an edition of 2,991 copies.  The novel originally appeared in the magazine Amazing Stories Quarterly in October 1931.

Plot introduction
The novel concerns the creation of a superman using radiation.

Reception
Reviewing the 1951 edition, Groff Conklin praised the novel as "a superb tale" despite "a style that can only be forgiven because of its age (1931) and characterization and a plot that can  hardly be forgiven at all." Also writing in 1951, Boucher and McComas noted that "even today it can still compete as one of the better treatments" of its theme. P. Schuyler Miller found the novel "top notch . . . full of the outrageously daring flights of the imagination which are the Taine trademark" as well as "plenty of the biting satire which we can also expect of a Taine book." New York Times reviewer Basil Davenport criticized the novel for its dubious science and "lack of a single clear narrative line," saying the novel "appeals only to the nerves."

Everett F. Bleiler found the opening segment of the novel to be "fascinating," but that as a whole "it suffers from formal defects, inadequate development at times, superfluity at others, weak characterizations, and problems with tone." Still, he concluded, "the novel is well worth reading for its virtues."

References

Sources

External links 
 
 

1951 American novels
1951 science fiction novels
American science fiction novels
Works originally published in Amazing Stories
Works by Eric Temple Bell
Works published under a pseudonym
Fantasy Press books